Zaytsevo is a rural locality (a village) in Verkhnetoyemsky District, Arkhangelsk Oblast, Russia. The population was 7 as of 2010.

Geography 
Zaytsevo is located on the Vya River, 195 km northeast of Verkhnyaya Toyma (the district's administrative centre) by road. Yeskino is the nearest rural locality.

References 

Rural localities in Verkhnetoyemsky District